Albert Memmi (15 December 1920 – 22 May 2020) was a French-Tunisian writer and essayist of Tunisian-Jewish origins.

Biography 
Memmi was born in Tunis, French Tunisia in December 1920, to a Tunisian Jewish Berber mother, Maïra (or Marguerite) Sarfati, and a Tunisian-Italian Jewish father, Fradji (or Fraji, or François) Memmi, and grew up speaking French and Tunisian-Judeo-Arabic. During the Nazi occupation of Tunisia, Memmi was imprisoned in a forced labor camp from which he later escaped.

Memmi was educated in French primary schools, and continued on to the Carnot high school in Tunis, the University of Algiers where he studied philosophy, and finally the Sorbonne in Paris. Albert Memmi found himself at the crossroads of three cultures, and based his work on the difficulty of finding a balance between the East and the West.

Parallel with his literary work, he pursued a career as a teacher, first as a teacher at the Carnot high school in Tunis (1953) and later in France (where he remained after Tunisian independence) at the École pratique des hautes études, at the École des hautes études commerciales in Paris and at the University of Nanterre (1970).

Although he supported the independence movement in Tunisia, he was not able to find a place in the new Muslim state both because of his French education and his Jewish faith, and following independence he "was asked to leave" the new state.

He died in May 2020, in Neuilly-sur-Seine, France, at the age of 99.

Writings
Memmi's well-regarded first novel, La statue de sel (translated as The Pillar of Salt), was published in 1953 with a preface by Albert Camus and was awarded the Fénéon Prize in 1954.  His other novels include Agar (translated as Strangers), Le Scorpion (The Scorpion), and Le Desert (The Desert).

His best-known non-fiction work is The Colonizer and the Colonized, about the interdependent relationship of the two groups.  It was published in 1957, a time when many national liberation movements were active.  Jean-Paul Sartre wrote the preface.  The work is often read in conjunction with Frantz Fanon's Les damnés de la Terre (The Wretched of the Earth) and Peau noire, masques blancs (Black Skin, White Masks) and Aimé Césaire's Discourse on Colonialism. In October 2006, Memmi's follow-up to this work, entitled Decolonization and the Decolonized, was published. In this book, Memmi suggests that in the wake of global decolonization, the suffering of former colonies cannot be attributed to the former colonizers, but to the corrupt leaders and governments that control these states.

Memmi's related sociological works include Dominated Man, Dependence, and Racism.

Sean P. Hier, in a review of Memmi's Racism, calls it "well-written and autobiographically informed." He writes that Memmi's main claim is that racism is a "'lived experience' arising within human situations which only secondarily become 'social experiences.' According to Hier, Memmi writes that racism is "endemic to collective human existence."

Memmi wrote extensively on Jewish identity, including Portrait of a Jew, Liberation of the Jew and Jews and Arabs.

He was also known for the Anthology of Maghrebian literature (written in collaboration) published in 1965 (vol. 1) and 1969 (vol. 2).

Reviewing Memmi's fiction, scholar Judith Roumani asserts that the Tunisian writer's work "reveals the same philosophical evolution over time from his original viewpoints to less radical but perhaps more realistic positions." She concludes that "his latest fiction is certainly more innovative and different than his earlier work."

In 1995, Memmi said of his own work: "All of my work has been in sum an inventory of my attachments; all of my work has been, it should be understood, a constant revolt against my attachments; all of my work, for certain, has been an attempt at...reconciliation between the different parts of myself."

Refuting scientific racism

In Racisme, Memmi defined racism as a social construction assigning values to biological differences (both real and imagined) “to the advantage of the one defining and deploying them, and to the detriment of the one subjected to that act of definition”.  In doing so, he countered three major arguments of scientific racism— a pseudoscientific belief in the existence of empirical evidence in support of racist beliefs. First, that pure and distinct races exist; second, that biologically ‘pure’ races were superior to others; and finally, that superior races had legitimate dominance over others. Memmi opposed this belief, asserting biological differences across human beings correlated with changes in geography, and that biological purity was a particular human fantasy. Memmi also pointed out that no evidence existed in support of the idea of racial purity, and merit, rather than biology, was the only basis of superiority. In this way, Memmi’s arguments for racism as a social construct were important in refuting the notion of science as a basis for racist thought.

Bibliography

French 
 À contre-courants. Paris: Nouvel Objet, c1993. 
 Ah, quel bonheur ! précédé de L'exercice du bonheur. Paris: Arléa: Diffusion Seuil, c1995. 
 Albert Memmi : un entretien avec Robert Davies suivi de Itinéraire de l'expérience vécue à la théorie de la domination. Montréal: Éditions L'Étincelle; distributeur, Réédition Québec, c1975.
 Bonheurs: 52 semaines. Paris: Arléa, c1992. 
 Le buveur et l'amoureux: le prix de la dépendance. Paris: Arléa : Diffusion Seuil, c.1998. 
 Ce que je crois. Paris: B. Grasset, c1985. 
 La dépendance: esquisse pour un portrait du dépendant. Paris: Gallimard, c.1979.
 Le désert: ou, La vie et les aventures de Jubair Ouali El-Mammi. Paris: Gallimard, c1977.
 Dictionnaire critique à l'usage des incrédules. Paris: Kiron/Editions du Félin, c.2002. 
 L'écriture colorée, ou, Je vous aime en rouge: essai sur une dimension nouvelle de l'écriture, la couleur. Paris: Périple : Distribution Distique, c1986. 
 L'Homme dominé. Paris: Gallimard, 1968.
 L'Homme dominé : le Noir, le colonisé, le prolétaire, le Juif, la femme, le domestique, le racisme. Nouvelle éd. Paris: Payot, 1973. 
 L'individu face à ses dépendances. Paris: Vuibert, c2005. 
 Le juif et l'autre. Etrepilly: C. de Bartillat, c1995. 
 Juifs et Arabes. Paris: Gallimard, 1974.
 Le nomade immobile : récit. Paris: Arléa, c2000. 
 Le personnage de Jeha dans la littérature orale des Arabes et des Juifs. Jerusalem: Institute of Asian and African Studies, Hebrew University of Jerusalem (1974?)
 Le pharaon : roman. Paris: Julliard, c1988. 
 Portrait du colonisé, précédé du portrait du colonisateur ... Preface by Jean-Paul Sartre. Paris: Payot, 1973.
 Portrait du colonisé, précédé du portrait du colonisateur; preface by Jean-Paul Sartre. Suivi de Les Canadiens francais sont-ils des colonisés? Ed. rev. et corr. par l'auteur. Montréal: L'Etincelle, 1972. 
 Portrait du colonisé, précédé de portrait du colonisateur: et d'une préface de Jean-Paul Sartre. Paris: Gallimard, c1985. 
 Portrait du décolonisé arabo-musulman et de quelques autres. Paris: Gallimard, c2004. 
 Portrait du décolonisé arabo-musulman et de quelques autres. Ed. corr. et augm. d'une postface. Paris: Gallimard, c2004. 
 Portrait d'un Juif. Paris: Gallimard, 1962–66.
 Le racisme : description, définition, traitement. Paris: Gallimard, c1982. 
 Le Scorpion, ou, La confession imaginaire. Paris: Gallimard, 1969.
 La statue de sel, roman. Paris: Correa [1953].
 La statue de sel. Préf. d'Albert Camus. Éd. revue et corr. Paris: Gallimard, 1966.
 Térésa et autres femmes: récits. Paris: Félin, c2004. 
 La terre intérieure: entretiens avec Victor Malka. Paris: Gallimard, c1976.

English 
 The Colonizer and the Colonized. Introduction by Jean-Paul Sartre; afterword by Susan Gilson Miller; translated by Howard Greenfeld. London, UK: Earthscan Publications, 1990, . Expanded ed. Boston: Beacon Press, c1991. 
 eBook version available. Plunkett Lake Press, 2013.    
 Decolonization and the Decolonized. Translated by Robert Bononno. Minneapolis: University of Minnesota Press, c2006. 
 Dependence: A Sketch for a Portrait. New York: Orion Press [1968].
 Jews and Arabs. Translated from the French by Eleanor Levieux. Chicago: J. P. O'Hara, c1975.  
 The Liberation of the Jew. Translated from the French by Judy Hyun. New York: Orion Press [1966].
 eBook version available. Plunkett Lake Press, 2013.   
 The Pillar of Salt. Translated by Edouard Roditi. Boston: Beacon Press, 1992. 
 The Pillar of Salt. Chicago: J. P. O'Hara, [1975] c1955. 
 eBook version available. Plunkett Lake Press, 2013.   
 Portrait of a Jew. Translated from the French by Elisabeth Abbott. New York: Orion Press [1962]
 eBook version available. Plunkett Lake Press, 2013.   
 Racism. Translated and with an introduction by Steve Martinot. Minneapolis: University of Minnesota Press, c2000. 
 The Scorpion, or, The Imaginary Confession. Translated from the French by Eleanor Levieux. New York: Grossman, 1971. 0670622710
 Strangers. Translated from the French by Brian Rhys. New York: Orion Press [1960]

Hebrew 
 Yehudim VeArvim, translated by Aharon Amir, Sifriyat Hapo'alim, [1975]
 Netziv Hamelah, translated by Yosef Luz, Sifria La'am- Am Oved, [1960]

External links 
 
 An article on Memmi's work

References 

1920 births
2020 deaths
20th-century French novelists
21st-century French novelists
French anti-racism activists
French Zionists
Jewish anti-racism activists
Jewish concentration camp survivors
Jewish writers
Writers from Tunis
Tunisian Jews
Tunisian novelists
Tunisian people of Italian-Jewish descent
Writers on antisemitism
University of Algiers alumni
University of Paris alumni
Academic staff of the École pratique des hautes études
Tunisian emigrants to France
Tunisian socialists
Postcolonialism
20th-century French essayists
21st-century French essayists
Prix Fénéon winners
Tunisian expatriates in Algeria
Tunisian Zionists